Amblotherium is an extinct genus of Late Jurassic and Early Cretaceous mammal. The type species Amblotherium pusillum is from the Lulworth Formation of southern England,  while the referred species Amblotherium gracile is from stratigraphic zones 2, 3 and 5 of the Morrison Formation of the US.

See also

 Paleobiota of the Morrison Formation

References

 Foster, J. (2007). Jurassic West: The Dinosaurs of the Morrison Formation and Their World. Indiana University Press. 389pp.

Dryolestida
Morrison mammals
Fossil taxa described in 1871
Early Cretaceous mammals of Europe
Late Jurassic genus first appearances
Berriasian genus extinctions
Prehistoric mammal genera